Ugo César Giorgetti (born 1942 in São Paulo) is a Brazilian filmmaker.

Early years
He works as scriptwriter and director of advertising films since 1966, initially at the Alcântara Machado, C & N, Denison and Proeme agencies, later for the companies Cia. de Cinema, Frame and Espiral.

In the early 1970s he made two short films about aspects of the city of São Paulo. His first feature, Quebrando a Cara, started in 1977 but released only in 1986, is a 16 mm documentary about the career and fights of boxer Éder Jofre.

Feature films
Giorgetti's first feature film, "Jogo Duro," tells the story of a group of marginalized people who dispute the occupation of a house in an upscale neighborhood of São Paulo. His next film "Festa" received the award for Best Film at the 1989 Gramado Festival. In 2004, the Aplauso Cinema Brasil Collection, from the Official Press of the State of São Paulo, published the volume "Ugo Giorgetti - o sonho intacto", by Rosane Pavam.

Football writer
Since 2006, Giorgetti has signed a weekly column on football in the Sunday edition of the newspaper O Estado de S. Paulo.

Filmography 
 1976: Rua São Bento, 405, Prédio Martinelli (curta)
 1976: Campos Elísios (curta)
 1985: Jogo duro
 1986: Quebrando a Cara (documentário)
 1989: Festa
 1995: Sábado
 1998: Boleiros - Era uma vez o futebol
 2000: Uma Outra Cidade (documentário)
 2002: O Príncipe
 2004: Boleiros 2 - Vencedores e vencidos
 2010: Solo
 2012: Cara ou Coroa
 2015: Uma Noite em Sampa

References

External links 

Brazilian people of Italian descent
Brazilian film directors
Brazilian columnists
1942 births
Living people
People from São Paulo